The chestnut bunting (Emberiza rutila) is a passerine bird in the bunting family Emberizidae found in the East Palearctic.

It is a fairly small bunting, 14 to 15 cm in length. The tail is fairly short with little or no white on the outer feathers. Breeding males have bright chestnut-brown upperparts and head. The breast and belly are yellow with streaks on the sides. Non-breeding males are similar but duller with the chestnut partly hidden by pale fringes to the feathers. The female is mostly dull brown with dark streaks above while the underparts are mainly pale yellow. The rump is dull chestnut and the throat is buff.

The variable, high-pitched song is given from a perch low in a tree. The call is a short zick, similar to the call of the little bunting.

It breeds in Siberia, northern Mongolia and north-eastern China. It is a long-distance migrant, wintering in southern China, south-east Asia and north-east India. There are a number of records from Europe but some of these are considered to be escapes from captivity rather than genuine vagrants. During the breeding season it inhabits open forest with plenty of ground cover and shrubs. Wintering and migrating birds occur in farmland, scrub and woodland edges.

References

Lee, Woo-Shin, Koo, Tae-Hoe & Park, Jin-Young (2000) A Field Guide to the Birds of Korea, LG Evergreen Foundation, Seoul.
Lewington, Ian; Alström, Per & Colston, Peter (1991) A Field Guide to the Rare Birds of Britain and Europe, HarperCollins.
MacKinnon, John & Phillipps, Karen (2000) A Field Guide to the Birds of China, Oxford University Press, Oxford.
Robson, Craig (2002) A Field Guide to the Birds of South-East Asia. New Holland, London.
Snow, D. W. & Perrins, C. M. (1998) Birds of the Western Palearctic: Concise Edition, Vol. 2, Oxford University Press, Oxford.

External links

Oriental Bird Images: chestnut bunting

chestnut bunting
Birds of Manchuria
Birds of Mongolia
chestnut bunting